Oba Francis Adedoyin (January 1922, in Tonkere – August 5, 2018) was the Ogunsua or traditional ruler of Modakeke he comes from Olagobin Royal family in Modakeke. He was one of the wealthiest rulers and a popular Oba in the Yorubaland.

He was crowned in 1994 originally and crowned with the beaded crown in 2009. On August 5, 2018 he was announced dead after a brief illness at Our Lady of Fatima Catholic Hospital, Jaleyemi, Osogbo in Osun State.

References

Sources
Ogunsua, Modakeke monarch, Oba Francis Olatunji Adedoyin joins his ancestor at 96
Modakeke.info: Nigeria: Modakeke: Monarch Returns After 7-Month Exile (28 Oct 2003)
Peace At Last, As Ogunsua, Modakeke Chief, Becomes Oba (9 February 2009)
OsunDefender.org: Ogunsua of Modakeke – Oba Francis Adedoyin (6 Oct 2009)

2018 deaths
1922 births
Nigerian traditional rulers
Osun State